This is a list of shore establishments (or stone frigates) of the Royal Navy and Royal Naval Reserve.

Current Royal Navy shore establishments

Naval bases
 (HMNB Devonport, Devonport, Devon)
 (HMNB Portsmouth, Portsmouth)
 (HMNB Clyde, Faslane, Dunbartonshire)

Air stations
 (RNAS Culdrose, Cornwall)
RNAS Predannack
 (RNAS Yeovilton, Somerset)
RNAS Merryfield
, South Ayrshire

Training establishments
  (Fareham, Hampshire)
  (Britannia Royal Naval College, Dartmouth, Devon)
Includes Hindostan as static training ship
  (Whale Island, Portsmouth)
  (Torpoint, Cornwall)
 Includes Brecon as static training ship
  (Gosport, Hampshire)
To be disposed of not before 2029 as part of the Defence Estate Optimisation plan
  (Directorate of Naval Physical Training and Sport (DNPTS), Portsmouth)

Other
 , Rosyth Dockyard, Rosyth, Fife
 , Administrative aggregation of Royal Navy personnel based in the United States
 Institute of Naval Medicine (Alverstoke, Hampshire) INM
 Northwood Headquarters (Northwood, Middlesex, England), formerly HMS Warrior.  Operational HQ for Commander Operations

Defence Munitions Centres
Formerly Royal Naval Armaments Depot and formally elements of Defence Equipment and Support.
 DM Beith
 RNAD Coulport
 DM Crombie
 DM Gosport

Testing establishments
 Vulcan Naval Reactor Test Establishment (HMS Vulcan) (Dounreay, Thurso, Caithness)
Currently being decommissioned

Overseas naval facilities
 HMS Jufair (Mina Salman Port, Bahrain)
 East Cove Military Port (Mare Harbour, Falkland Islands)
 Port of Gibraltar (Gibraltar)
 UK Joint Logistics Support Base (Duqm, Oman)
 British Defence Singapore Support Unit (Sembawang, Singapore)

 Diego Garcia (British Indian Ocean Territory)

Current Royal Marines establishments

Commando Training Centre Royal Marines, Lympstone, Devon
Stonehouse Barracks, Plymouth, Devon – Headquarters 3 Commando Brigade
RM Poole, Hamworthy Barracks, Poole, Dorset
RM Condor, Arbroath, Angus – 45 Commando, 30 Commando
RM Tamar, HMNB Devonport – 47 Commando
Norton Manor Camp, Taunton, Somerset – 40 Commando
Bickleigh Barracks, Plymouth, Devon – 42 Commando
RM Chivenor, Braunton, Devon – Commando Logistic Regiment
RM Instow (also known as Arromanches Camp), Instow, Devon.

Significant RM presences are also located in:
HM Naval Base Portsmouth
HM Naval Base Clyde – 43 Commando
MOD St Athan
RNAS Yeovilton – Commando Helicopter Force
Bovington Camp – Royal Marines Armoured Support Group

Royal Marines Band Service
 HMS Nelson, HMNB Portsmouth – Band of HM Royal Marines School of Music
HMS Raleigh – Band of HM Royal Marines Plymouth
HMS Collingwood – Band of HM Royal Marines Collingwood
MoD Caledonia – Band of HM Royal Marines Scotland
Commando Training Centre Royal Marines – Band of HM Royal Marines Commando Training Centre Royal Marines

Current Royal Naval Reserve units and establishments
The modern Royal Naval Reserve has fifteen Units (with 3 satellite units). These are:

 , Gateshead, Tyne & Wear, England
 , Cardiff, Wales
 Tawe Division (Swansea)
, Leeds, West Yorkshire, England
 , Glasgow, Scotland
 , Liverpool, England
 , Birmingham, England
 , Bristol, England
 , Chicksands, Bedfordshire, England
 , Lisburn, Northern Ireland
 , Whale Island, Portsmouth, Hampshire, England
 , by Tower Bridge, London E1, England
 Medway Division (Chatham, Kent)
 , Rosyth, Fife, Scotland (Within the grounds of HMS Caledonia)
 Tay Division (Dundee)
 , Nottingham, England
 , HMNB Devonport, Plymouth, Devon, England
 , Northwood, Middlesex, England

Former shore establishments

Former Imperial fortresses
Admiralty House, Bermuda, Royal Naval Dockyard Bermuda (and HM Naval Base Bermuda (HMS Malabar), Royal Naval Air Station Bermuda, HMCS Somers Isles
Royal Navy Dockyard, Gibraltar, HMS Rooke
Admiralty House, Halifax, Royal Naval Dockyard, Halifax
Admiralty House, Valletta, HM Dockyard Malta

Former naval bases

HMNB Rosyth, (Fife, UK)
HMNB Chatham (Kent, UK)
Woolwich Dockyard
Deptford Dockyard
Queenstown
Portland Dockyard
Scapa Flow
Pembroke Dockyard
Sheerness Dockyard
Simon's Town Dockyard
Sihanoukville Dockyard
Trincomalee Dockyard
Kingston Royal Naval Dockyard
Amherstburg Royal Naval Dockyard
Esquimalt Royal Navy Dockyard
Penetanguishene Naval Yard
Naval Shipyards, York (Upper Canada)

Former air stations

 RNAS Lee-on-Solent (HMS Daedalus) (previously HMS Ariel) Lee-on-the-Solent, Hampshire, England
 , World War II Royal Naval Air Station at Worthy Down, Hampshire
 RNAS Lossiemouth (HMS Fulmar) Lossiemouth, Moray 1946 -1972
 , Dunino Kingsbarns Fife  Satellite airfield of Crail
 RNAS Donibristle, Fife  1917–1959 (also known as RAF Donibristle)
 HMS Osprey, naval air station, (Portland, Dorset, England)   ASDIC training; Flag Officer Sea Training; RNAS Portland (Lynx helicopter)
 , Grimsetter, Kirkwall, Orkney, RNAS Grimsetter
 , Gosport Hampshire, Now 
 HMS Tern, Twatt Orkney RNAS Twatt
 , RNAS Anthorn
 HMS Goldcrest, Brawdy. Pembrokeshire
 HMS Urley, Second World War flying station on the Isle of Man

Former Royal Naval Hospitals

 RNH Bermuda.
 RNH Bighi, Malta
 RNH Gibraltar, Gibraltar
 RNH Gillingham, in Medway, Kent
 RNH Greenwich, in London
 RNH Haslar, Gosport, England
 RNH Mauritius
 RNH Mtarfa, Malta
 RNH Plymouth, known as Stonehouse, Devonport, England
 RNH Portland, Dorset.
 RNH Simon's Town, South Africa
 Royal Naval Hospital (Hong Kong) – now Ruttonjee Hospital in Hong Kong, China
 RNH Trincomalee, Trincomalee, Sri Lanka (Ceylon)

Former shore bases

A to D
 , Tilbury
 , the bombed-out Supermarine factory, Woolston, Southampton
 , Base depot ship, Simon's Town, South Africa
 , Coastal Forces Motor Launch (ML) and Steam Gun Boat base, Newhaven, East Sussex
 , Combined Operations base, Folkestone
 , Headquarters of 9th Submarine Flotilla (1940–1946), Dundee 
 , listening station of the Far East Combined Bureau, Colombo, Ceylon
  (later ), Combined Training Centre, Castle Toward, Toward, Argyll 
 , Combined Operations Landing Craft Training Establishment, Boston, Lincolnshire
 , Combined Operations base and training establishment, Fremington Camp, Fremington, Devon
 HMS Appledore II, Combined Operations base, Ilfracombe
  (formerly ), RNAS Worthy Down, Winchester, Hampshire
 , Royal Naval Aircraft Training Establishment, Culcheth, Warrington, Cheshire
 HMS Armanillo, Combined Operations RN Beach Commando training centre, Glenfinnart 
 HMS Asbury, shore based transit accommodation, Asbury Park, New Jersey
 HMS Atlantic Isle, U-boat monitoring station, Tristan da Cunha during WWII
 , Coastal Forces MLs and storage, RN Dockyard, Portland
 HMS Avalon, St. John's, Newfoundland and Labrador, Canada
 , HQ of Flag Officer Harwich and Coastal Forces base (1939–1946), Harwich
 HMS Baldur (also HMS Baldur II), Accommodation and accounting, Iceland
 HMS Beaver, HQ, Flag Officer-in-Charge, Humber, (1 October 1940 – July 1945) – (base A.O. at Grimsby)
 HMS Beaver II, Coastal Forces MLs, Immingham
 , Coastal Forces MLs working up base, Weymouth (1942–1943), then Holyhead, Wales (1943–1945)
 , Coastal Forces MTBs and MGBs, Boomer Hall, Felixstowe, Suffolk
 , Portsmouth, Hampshire
 , Trinidad
 HMS Birnbeck, Secret weapons research and testing (1941–1946), Birnbeck Pier, Weston-super-Mare
 HMS Bluebird III, (formerly HMS Allenby, possibly), Folkestone
 , Naval Police Patrol HQ, Portland, Dorset
 HMS Britannia III, Coastal Forces Motor Torpedo Boat & Motor Gun Boats, Dartmouth
  (formerly ), Combined Operations landing craft crew training, Castle Toward, Toward, Argyll 
 HMS Cabbala, Training establishment for WRNS W/T operators, at Lowton near Warrington
 , Rosyth, Fife 
 , Wembury, Devon
 , Coastal Forces MLs, Belfast
 , Gosport, Hampshire
 , Haslemere, Surrey
  (formerly ), Wetherby, Yorkshire
 , Yeadon, West Yorkshire
 , Coastal Forces MTBs & MGBs, Dartmouth
 , Coastal Forces MLs, Leith 
  (formerly RNAS Donibristle/), Rosyth, Fife 
 HMS Copra, Combined Operations Pay, Ratings and Accounts, The Moorings, Largs
 , Landing Craft training base, River Hamble, Hampshire
 , Royal Naval Reserve base, Greenock, Inverclyde,
 , Royal Naval Reserve base, Inverkip, Inverclyde,  
 HMS Dartmouth II, Coastal Forces MTBs, MGBs & MLs, Dartmouth
 , Torpedo school, Devonport, Devon
 , Fleet Maintenance Base, Devonport
  I, HQ for tank landing craft training, Troon, Ayrshire 
 HMS Dinosaur II, Landing craft and work-up base, Irvine, Ayrshire 
 HMS Dorlin, Combined Operations RN Beach Signals and Royal Signals sections battle training, Dorlin House, Acharacle, Argyll 
 , Gosport, Hampshire
 , former location of the Maritime Warfare School, Southwick, Hampshire
 , Basic Training Establishment, Malvern, 1944–1945. The Telecommunications Research Establishment moved into Duke in 1946 (renamed in turn the Radar Research Establishment, the Royal Radar Establishment and the Royal Signals and Radar Establishment) and is now a QinetiQ research site.
  I, Holding and training base for RN Beach Commandos, Gailes Camp, Auchengate, Troon, Ayrshire 
 HMS Dundonald II, Combined Signal School (CSS), Auchingate, Troon, Ayrshire

E to K
 , Naval HQ, Fort St Angelo, Birgu, Malta
  (later HMS Sea Eagle), Convoy escort base and anti-submarine training, Londonderry, Northern Ireland
 , Coastal Forces MTBs, MGBs & MLs, Ramsgate
 , artificer and engineer training (1848–1983), Torpoint, Cornwall
 HMS Flora III, Coastal Forces MLs, Invergordon, Scotland
, HQ of Mobile Naval Air Bases during World War II, Ludham then Middle Wallop. RNAS Kai Tak from 1947.
 HMS Flowerdown, Y-station at RAF Flowerdown
 HMS Foliot I, Landing craft accounting base, Plymouth
 HMS Foliot III, Combined Operations holding base, Buckleigh, Plymouth
 , HF receiver station, Nidderdale, Harrogate
 HMS Forte IV, Coastal Forces MLs, Falmouth
 , Command and radar plotting centre, Newhaven
 HMS Forward II (later HMS Aggressive), Coastal Forces MTBs, Newhaven
 , Coastal Forces MTBs & MLs, Lerwick, Scotland
 , Boys' Training Establishment, Shotley, Ipswich, Suffolk
  WWII training establishment, Butlin's Pwllheli holiday camp, Caernarfonshire 
 HMS Golden Hind, WW2 RN Barracks, Sydney, Australia
 HMS Gosling, Royal Naval Air Establishment, Risley, Warrington, Cheshire, was a collection of 5 camps responsible for various aspects of training FAA personnel
 , Auxiliary Patrol base, Lerwick, Shetland
 , Rye
 , Algiers
 , Radar training establishment, near Dale, Pembrokeshire
 , Landing craft, Exbury House, Hampshire
 , Landing craft training, Brightlingsea
 , Scapa Flow diversionary anchorage, 1939–40, Arctic convoys concentration point, 1942–44, Loch Ewe 
 , Trincomalee, Ceylon
 , Coastal Forces Depot MTB, Gosport, Hampshire
 , WWI base at Milford Haven, Pembrokeshire
 , Inskip, Preston, Lancashire
 , RNAS Crail, Fife
 , Combined Operations Beach Training Establishment, Glen Caladh, Nr Tighnabruaich, Argyll 
 , Bahrain
  (later HMS Ariel), Royal Naval Air Station and General Service Establishment, Worthy Down, near Winchester, England
 , WWII RNVR officer training centre, Hove, Sussex

L to R
 , Colombo, Ceylon
 , Combined Operations landing craft base, Shoreham
 , Combined Operations officer training, Inverailort House, Lochailort, Inverness-shire 
 , Fleet Minesweeper base, Port Edgar, South Queensferry 
  (also HMS Roseneath), Combined Operations, Roseneath, Dunbartonshire 
 HMS Lynx, HQ, Naval Officer-in-Charge, Dover & CO HMS Lynx, (10 July 1945 – April 1946)
 , Bootle, Cumbria, England. FAA aircrew reception centre.
 , Bermuda
 , Landing craft, Yarmouth, Isle of Wight
 , Electrical training school, Eastbourne
 , Landing craft, Exbury House, Hampshire
 , Mauritius
 HMS Martelo, HQ Naval Officer-in-Charge, Lowestoft, (1 October 1945 – April 1946)
 , Landing craft and Fleet Air Arm, Puckpool, Ryde, Isle of Wight
 , Lews Castle, Stornoway, Western Isles 
 , Communications Training Centre, Coventry
 , Communications school, Petersfield, Hampshire
 , Great Yarmouth
 HMS Minos, HQ Naval Officer-in-Charge, Lowestoft, (5 May 1942 – 1 October 1945)
 , Combined Training HQ, Largs, Ayrshire 
 HMS Monck, Combined Operations Carrier Training, Port Glasgow 
 HMS Monck, Roseneath, Dunbartonshire 
 HMS Monck, HQ Flag Officer Greenock, Greenock 
 HMS Nemo, HQ Naval Officer-in-Charge, Brightlingsea, (June 1940 – May 1945)
 , Landing craft base, Newhaven
 , Alexandria, Egypt (1939–1946)
 , Anti-submarine warfare training from early 1940, Campbeltown, Argyll 
  (HMS Northney I, HMS Northney II, HMS Northney III and HMS Northnney IV), Landing craft training base, Hayling Island
 HMS Osprey, (from January 1941), Asdic training, advanced courses for officers, Dunoon, Argyll 
 , RNAS Fearn, Fearn, Ross-shire
 , Combined Operations landing craft signals training, Glenbranter Camp, Glenbranter, Strachur, Argyll 
 , HQ, Commander-in-Chief, the Nore, (RN base, Chatham) Chatham, Kent
 , HQ, Admiral-Superintendent, Chatham Dockyard, Chatham, Kent
 , HQ, Commodore-in-Command, Royal Naval Barracks, Chatham, Chatham, Kent
 HMS Phœnicia, Manoel Island, Malta
 , Tipner, Portsmouth, Hampshire
  (parts later spun out as HMS St Vincent), Admiralty accounting base, Furse House, 37 Queen's Gate Terrace, London SW7
 HMS President II, HQ, Liaison Officer for Naval Reserve and Merchant Navy Duties, London, (8 February 1938 – August 1939)
 , Lyness, Orkney 
 , Kirkwall, Orkney 
 HMS Queen Charlotte WWII land-based gunnery school, Shore Rd., Ainsdale Southport, Lancashire
 , Combined Operations training, Inverary, Argyll 
 HMS Return, Tokyo, Japan – now British Embassy in Tokyo
 , Holding base for RM landing craft personnel, Kitchener Camp, Richborough, Kent
 , Gibraltar
  (also HMS Louisburg), Combined Operations, Roseneath, Dunbartonshire 
 , Wireless Station (SIGINT), Cuxhaven, Germany.  Post-WWII
 , Petty Officers' training school, Butlins Skegness, later Corsham, Wiltshire
 , Wireless Station (SIGINT), Cuxhaven, Germany.  Post-WWII
 Royal Naval College, Greenwich, London

S to Z
 , Naval HQ, Fort St Angelo, Birgu, Malta
 , Bognor Regis, Sussex, anti-aircraft firing range and gunnery training school
 , Coastal Forces training base, Fort William, Inverness-shire
 HMS St George, Gosport, Hampshire
 , Commando training base 1943–1945, Burnham-on-Crouch, Essex
  (1927–1969), Boys and Juniors Training Establishment, Gosport, Hampshire
  (1992–1998), Communications centre, Whitehall, London
 , RNR Communications Training Centre, Salford
 , RNAS Abbotsinch, Abbotsinch, Glasgow 
 , Basic training, 1942, from 1959 RNR Rosyth, Butlin's Ayr, South Ayrshire 
  (formerly ), Eglinton, County Londonderry, Northern Ireland
 , Bracklesham Bay and Birdham, near Chichester
 HMS Seahawk, Coastal Forces training base, Ardrishaig, Argyll
  (Singapore Naval Base), was the Royal Navy's biggest dockyard and its base of operations in the Far East from 1939 until 1971.  (1945–1971) was the barracks next to the naval base, while the nearby  was a RN Air Station.
 , Aden
 , Western Approaches Command, St Enoch's Hotel, Glasgow 
 , Tank landing craft repair base, Southampton
 HMS Squid II, Landing craft squadron staff, Westcliff Hall Hotel, Hythe
 , WWII training establishment for men who would otherwise be discharged, Kielder, Northumberland
 , Landing craft working-up base, Bo'ness 
 HMS Talbot, Manoel Island, Malta
 , Base operated from 1897 to 1997 at two locations in Hong Kong
 , Hydrophone training school during World War I, Hawkcraig near Aberdour 
 , Royal Naval Engineering College, Keyham and Manadon, Plymouth, Devon
 HMS Tormentor, Landing craft operational base, Hamble, Southampton
 HMS Tormentor II Training camp, Cowes, Isle of Wight
 HMS Tullichewan (previously HMS Spartiate II), Holding base for Combined Operations, Tullichewan Castle Camp, Balloch, Loch Lomond, Scotland
 , Combined Operations training, Poole, Dorset
 , Diyatalawa, Ceylon
 HMS Valkyrie, Training establishment for HO ratings, Isle of Man
 , X class submarine training, Port Bannatyne Hydropathic Hotel, Port Bannatyne, Isle of Bute, Scotland
 , X class submarine advanced training, Ardtaraig House, Loch Striven, Argyll, Scotland
 HMS Vectis (shore establishment), Cowes Castle, Cowes, Isle of Wight
 , Portsmouth, Hampshire
 , RNAS Ayr 
 , Combined Operations senior officer training, Largs, Ayrshire 
 , Coastal Forces HQ, Lord Warden Hotel, Dover
 HMS Watchful, HQ, Flag Officer-in-Charge, Yarmouth, (14 April 1942 – July 1945)
 , Flotilla training, Southend
 HMS Westcliffe II, Combined Operations holding base for RM landing craft personnel, Burnham-on-Crouch, Essex
 , Chatham, Kent
 HMS Wildfire II (1939–1940), Combined Operations base, Sheerness
 HMS Wildfire III (1940–1946), Combined Operations base, Sheerness
 , Landing craft base, Ipswich
 HMS Yeoman, HQ, Flag Officer-in-Charge, London, (3 February 1942 – July 1945)
 HMS Yeoman, HQ, Naval Officer-in-Charge, London, (1-30, April, 1946)

Other
 Bedhampton Camp, former non airfield satellite of RNAS Lee-on-Solent (HMS Daedalus).
 Seafield Park, a non airfield site near to RNAS Lee-on-Solent.
 Yarmouth Roads, former fleet anchorage off Great Yarmouth, Norfolk, England (1294–1815)
Royal Naval Armaments Depots

 RNAD Broughton Moor, Cumbria, England
 RNAD Crombie, Fife 
 RNAD Dean Hill, Salisbury, Wiltshire, England
 RNAD Gosport including Priddy's Hard, Hampshire, England
Royal Naval Stores Depots
 Include:
 RNSD Almondbank/RNAW Almondbank/RNAW Perth, Almondbank, Perth & Kinross – now a Eurocopter installation.
 RNSD Coventry, Warwickshire, England
 RNSD Copenacre, England. (1940–1995),
 RNSD Eaglescliffe, Teesside, England
 RNSD Llangennech, Llangennech, Carmarthenshire, Wales, (1945–1995) 
 RNSD Lathalmond, Dunfermline, Scotland
 RNSD Trecwn, Trecwn, Pembrokeshire, West Wales
 RNSD Woolston, Woolston, Southampton, Hampshire, England
Royal Navy Aircraft Yards
 RNAY Wroughton, Aircraft storage and maintenance unit, Wroughton, Swindon, England

See also
 Admiralty Mining Establishment

References

Further reading
Shield of Empire – The Royal Navy and Scotland, Brian Lavery, Birlinn 2007

External links
Coastal Forces Shore establishments
Combined Operations Training Establishments

Royal Navy shore establishments